The Kempsey bus crash occurred in Australia on 22 December 1989 when two full Denning Landseer tourist coaches, each travelling at 100 km/h, collided head-on on the Pacific Highway at Clybucca Flat,  north of Kempsey, New South Wales. It remains the worst road accident in Australia; 35 people died, including both drivers, and another 41 were injured.

The impact snapped seats from their anchor bolts. Seats and passengers were thrown forward in the vehicles with a terrific amount of force, which also trapped people and their luggage against the fronts of the buses. The force of the impact left the Sydney-bound coach, operated by McCafferty's Coaches, embedded in the front five rows of the cabin of the Brisbane-bound coach, operated by Trans City Express. The accident triggered a major emergency response as police, State Emergency Service and volunteer rescuers, firefighters and paramedics attended the accident.

A fleet of air ambulances and helicopters carried the injured to hospitals at Kempsey, Port Macquarie, Coffs Harbour and Sydney. A New South Wales Coroner's inquiry into the collision found that the driver of the McCafferty's coach fell asleep at the wheel. This caused his vehicle to travel straight on through a left-hand curve on the highway and collide with the Trans City Express coach. There was no indication that the driver had applied his brakes or dimmed the headlights, the coroner found. Neither coach was speeding at the time of the crash, and no mechanical faults were found in either vehicle.

The coroner (Kevin Waller) endorsed the recommendation he made following the Grafton bus crash two months earlier, that the Pacific Highway be upgraded to dual carriageway between Newcastle and the Queensland border. The New South Wales and Commonwealth governments committed to carry out the required work, with an initial promised completion date of 2006. This target never came close to being met; at July 2008, only 267 kilometres (or 39%) of the route had been upgraded to dual carriageway standard, with 87 kilometres of divided road under construction and 325 kilometres of the highway still a single carriageway. As of May 2016, following a sustained upgrade program, 437 kilometres (65%) of the highway between Hexham and the Queensland border was dual carriageway (either at freeway or arterial road standards), with 240 kilometres of single carriageway remaining to be upgraded. The final section was completed in December 2020, bringing an end to the project after 24 years.

The coroner also recommended research into coach seats, seat anchorages and seatbelts. Better emergency exits for coaches were also recommended, as rescuers were hindered in their initial efforts to enter the wreckage by the positioning of the exits 2.4m from the ground.

Following the collision and despite the extensive damage incurred, both coaches were rebuilt by Denning, being completed in June 1990 and allocated body numbers 1378 (Trans City Express – original body 1238) and 1379 (McCafferty's – original body 1335). After the demise of Trans City Express in March 1992, much of its fleet was sold off and McCafferty's was among the purchasers, buying three coaches including the one involved in the accident. Both of the rebuilt coaches remained in service with McCafferty's for more than a decade.

The McCafferty's coach from the Kempsey crash was involved in another accident exactly 14 years later, in the early hours of 22 December 2003.  On this occasion the coach was travelling south towards Rockhampton on the Bruce Highway when it was involved in a head-on collision with a truck. On this occasion there were no fatalities, with six people suffering minor injuries. However, the coach was damaged beyond economic repair and was written off.

This accident and the Grafton bus crash eight weeks earlier were described as "arguably Australia’s most catastrophic examples of high consequence/low probability incidents in the bus industry" in a bus safety discussion document.

The section of the Pacific Highway where the collision occurred was bypassed in May 2016 by a dual carriageway as part of the upgrades recommended by the coroner and is now named Macleay Valley Way.

See also
 List of disasters in Australia by death toll

References
 News video of accident
 National Nine News – Nightline clip
 Emergency NSW article including photo
 Mention on Emergency Management Australia website
 "Pacific Highway Upgrade" –  NSW Parliament mention in Hansard

1989 in Australia
Disasters in New South Wales
Bus transport in New South Wales
Bus incidents in Australia
Road incidents in Australia
1989 road incidents
1980s in New South Wales
December 1989 events in Australia
1989 disasters in Australia